Tülin Şahin (born 13 December 1979) is a Danish-Turkish top model, television presenter, author, and actress.

Life and career 
Şahin was born in Odense, Denmark, and spent her childhood there. She was discovered in a shopping mall and went to do professional modeling career in Paris in 1998. She came to Turkey, the birthplace of her parents to work for Zeki Triko. Şahin was dubbed as 'Sivaslı Cindy' or 'Cindy from Sivas' because of her close resemblance to Cindy Crawford (she has also her same mole) and Sivas being her hometown.

She had also done charity and philanthropic work with her former husband Mehmet Özer. She later established the website tuliss.com for women.

References

External links 
Official website
TULISS by Tülin Şahin

1979 births
Living people
People from Odense
People from Sivas
Turkish female models
Turkish television presenters
Danish people of Turkish descent
Turkish women television presenters